In Yazidism, the Silat Bridge is a bridge in Lalish, Iraq that leads to the most holy Yazidi shrine. It symbolizes the connection and crossing over from the profane earthly world and the sacred, esoteric world. As with the Chinvat Bridge in Zoroastrianism, the Silat Bridge in will also play a role at the end of times in Yazidism (Kreyenbroek 2005: 39).

Every year, thousands of Yazidi pilgrims arrive at the bridge for the Feast of the Assembly as they cross the bridge to the sacred site of Sheikh Adi's tomb.

See also
 As-Sirāt
 Bifröst
 Brig of Dread
 Chinvat Bridge
 Matarta
 Vaitarna River
 Otherworld
 Zoroastrian eschatology

References

Mythological bridges
Yazidi mythology